Konstantin Stanislavovich Krizhevsky (20 February 1926 – 18 November 2000) was a Russian football defender. He was born in Odintsovo, Russia. He competed for the Soviet Union at the 1952 Olympics, and the 1958 FIFA World Cup.

Honours
 Soviet Top League winner: 1954, 1955, 1957, 1959.
 Soviet Cup winner: 1953.

References

External links
  Profile

1926 births
2000 deaths
People from Odintsovo
Russian footballers
Soviet footballers
Association football defenders
Soviet Union international footballers
Olympic footballers of the Soviet Union
Footballers at the 1952 Summer Olympics
1958 FIFA World Cup players
PFC Krylia Sovetov Samara players
FC Dynamo Moscow players
Soviet Top League players
Sportspeople from Moscow Oblast